The 'Hours of Angers or Hours for the Angers usage is a type of medieval book of Hours. It is used to follow the rite of the canonical hours as practised in Anjou in general and Angers in particular. Examples are held by the Bibliothèque nationale de France, the Fitzwilliam Museum and the Bodleian Library.

References

15th-century illuminated manuscripts
Angers
Manuscripts of the Fitzwilliam Museum
Bibliothèque nationale de France collections
Bodleian Library collection